Herta Anitaș (born 18 August 1962) is a retired Romanian rower who won a silver and a bronze medal at the 1988 Olympics.

References

External links 
 
 
 
 

1962 births
Living people
Romanian female rowers
Rowers at the 1988 Summer Olympics
Olympic rowers of Romania
Olympic silver medalists for Romania
Olympic bronze medalists for Romania
Olympic medalists in rowing
Medalists at the 1988 Summer Olympics
World Rowing Championships medalists for Romania